John Howie (14 November 1735 – 5 January 1793) was a Scottish biographer. His best known work was  Biographia Scoticana, first published in 1775, which is often called The Scots Worthies. It deals with Christians and particularly Presbyterians especially in their strivings with church and civil authorities.

Life
John Howie was an East Renfrewshire farmer from Lochgoin, who claimed descent from an Albigensian refugee. The author was the 28th descendant in a direct line, all of whom were called John. Although he was a plain unlettered peasant, cultivating the same farm which his ancestors had occupied for ages, a natural predilection for literary pursuits induced him to take up the task of recording the lives of the martyrs and confessors of Scotland. His family home at Lochgoin Farm was a noted refuge for Covenanters, and was subject to several searches by government soldiers. The farmhouse was rebuilt in the 18th century, with the date 1187 on a lintel marking when the Howies first settled there. Several relics were kept in what has become a small museum, and in 1896 a stone obelisk was erected nearby as a monument "in memory of John Howie, author of the Scots Worthies". It now lies within the area of Whitelee Wind Farm and has track access from the visitor centre.

Works
Howie wrote Lives of the Protestant worthies of Scotland from Patrick Hamilton, the first martyr, under the title of Biographia Scoticana, first published in 1775. It became a classic of Scottish Church History and was often called The Scots Worthies. He revised and enlarged the work, 1781–5, and this edition was reissued, with notes by William McGavin, in 1827. In 1870 the Rev. William Henderson Carslaw revised Howie's text and published it, with illustrations and notes, and a short biographical introduction; and in 1876 a further illustrated edition appeared, with biographical notice compiled from statements made by Howie's relatives, and an introductory essay by Dr. Robert Buchanan.

A Collection of Lectures and Sermons by Covenanting Clergymen was issued by Howie in 1779, with an introduction by himself. He edited in 1780 Michael Shields's Faithful Contendings Display'd, an account of the Church of Scotland between 1681 and 1691. He also wrote on the Lord's Supper, patronage, and other topics, and prefaced and annotated other religious works.

The Lives in Biographia Scoticana (2nd edition)

The list below reflects the chapter order in the book. For an alphabetical list see the "Scots Worthies" template at the foot of the page. 
Patrick Hamilton
George Wishart
Walter Mill
James Stuart, Earl of Moray
John Knox
George Buchanan
Robert Rollock
John Craig
David Black
 John Davidson
William Row
Andrew Melville
Patrick Simpson
Andrew Duncan
John Scrimgeour
John Welch
Robert Boyd
Robert Bruce
Josias Welch
John Gordon, Viscount Kenmuir
Robert Cunningham
Alexander Henderson
George Gillespie
John M'Clellan
David Calderwood
Hugh Binning
Andrew Gray
James Durham
Samuel Rutherford
Archibald Campbell, Marquis of Argyle
James Guthrie
John Campbell, Earl of Loudon
Robert Baillie
David Dickson
Archibald Johnston, Lord Warriston
James Wood
William Guthrie
Hugh Mackail
John Nevay
John Livingston
John Semple
James Mitchell
William Gordon of Earlston
John Kid
John King
John Brown of Wamphray
Henry Hall of Haughhead
Richard Cameron
David Hackston of Rathillet
Robert Ker of Kersland
Donald Cargill
Robert Garnock
Robert M'Ward
John Paton
John Nisbet of Hardhill
Alexander Peden
John Blackadder
James Renwick
Alexander Moncrieff
Angus MacBean
Thomas Hog
Robert Fleming
Alexander Shields
John Dickson
Sir Robert Hamilton of Preston
William Veitch
John Balfour of Kinloch
Robert Traill, father
Robert Traill, and son

See also
Robert Wodrow

References

Citations

Sources

Attribution

External links
 
 

1735 births
1793 deaths
Scottish biographers
People from East Renfrewshire
18th-century Scottish farmers